The Sidecar TT is a motorcycle-with-sidecar road race competition held over two legs which takes place during the Isle of Man TT festival, an annual event at the end of May and beginning of June. Between 1954 and 1976 this race was part of the Grand Prix motorcycle racing world championship.

Engine capacity
The 1923 races was the first time the Sidecar TT race was run, over 3 laps (113 miles) of the Mountain Course won by Freddie Dixon and passenger T.W.Denney with a special Douglas banking-sidecar at an average race speed of 53.15 mph. For the 1926 races the Sidecar TT and Ultra-Lightweight TT were dropped due to lack of entries.

The Sidecar TT race was re-introduced in the 1954 event for machines not exceeding 500 cc engine capacity, run on the Clypse Course.  A non-championship 750 cc class for sidecars was introduced for the 1968 event. From 1975, the previous 500 cc and 750 classes were replaced by a 1000 cc engine capacity class. For 1976 the event became a race held over two-legs. The new FIM Formula 2 class for Sidecar outfits was introduced for the 1990 races.

 1954–1959 Sidecars not exceeding 500 cc engine capacity. Race held on Clypse Course.
 1960–1976 World Championship event held on Snaefell Mountain Course not exceeding 500 cc.
 1968–1974 Non-Championship event not exceeding 750 cc.
 1975–1989 not exceeding 1000 cc engine capacity.
 1990– onwards FIM Formula 2 Sidecar race for two-stroke engines not exceeding 350 cc or four-stroke engines not exceeding 600 cc.

Eligibility

Entrants
 Entrants must be in possession of a valid National Entrants or FIM Sponsors Licence for Road Racing.
 Sidecar Passengers must hold a TT Course Licence as a passenger.

Formula Two Sidecar TT Specifications
The 2012 specification for entries into the Sidecar TT race were defined as any machine complying with the following specifications:
 Machines must comply with general technical rules as per ACU Standing Regulations and 2012 IOM TT regulations.
 Engine Types
501 – 600cc, 4 stroke, 4 cylinder, production based motor-cycle engines.
Rotary engines are not permitted.
Fuel injection systems are permitted using only the throttle-bodies as homologated for the motorcycle engine used by the entrant.
Electronic traction control system is prohibited. Wheel speed sensors are not permitted.
General Construction
The Sidecar may be placed either side of the motorcycle. Hinged sidecars and steerable sidecar wheels are prohibited.
The three road wheels may be disposed as to give two or three tracks.
If three tracks are made then the centres of the tracks of the motorcycle shall not be more than 75mm apart.
The main chassis frame must consist of, at a minimum - a steering head, a frame to accommodate the engine and a main spar to the sidecar wheel which will be made from good quality steel tube.
The tubing used for the construction of the frame may be of a circular or non-circular section, and the outside diameter shall not exceed 101.6mm.
Minimum suspension travel to be no less than 20mm.
Monocoque construction is prohibited and the use of composite construction is forbidden with the single exception of the sidecar platform (i.e. aluminium or carbon fibre skinned honeycomb).
Engine Position
The engine must be positioned behind the steering head and in front of the driver.
The final drive must be transmitted to the road through the rear wheel of the motorcycle. An engine positioned behind the driver and in front of the rear drive wheel is prohibited.
The engine must be positioned so that the centre-line of the engine will not exceed 160mm beyond the centre-line of the rear wheel of the motorcycle.
Dimensions
Width (Overall Maximum) 1575 mm. Wheelbase (Maximum) 1651 mm. Track 800 mm minimum, 1105mm maximum. Height (Overall Maximum) 800 mm
Weight (Minimum) 136.5 kg without fuel. The addition of ballast to reach this official minimum weight is prohibited.
Wheels
Wheel rim diameter of 254 mm and 64mm in width. The diameter of the tyre must be as least 400mm and the width 100mm; maximum front tyre width 220mm. The use of slick tyres is permitted.
Steering
Steering of the front wheel must be by a non-adjustable handlebars securely fixed to the forks or yokes of the motorcycle with no intermediate push or pull rods and all steering elements must be located on the sprung portion of the front suspension unit.
Brakes
All three wheels must be braked and use only ferrous brake discs.

Official Qualification Time
 115% of the time set by the third fastest qualifier in the class.

Speed and lap records
The lap record for the Sidecar TT is 18 minutes and 59.018 seconds, an average speed of  set by Ben Birchall and passenger Tom Birchall during Race 2 in 2018.

Sidecar TT race winners

By driver

 *Indicates Sidecar TT wins on the Clypse Course.

By passenger

 *Indicates Sidecar TT wins on the Clypse Course.

By marque

See also
TT Zero
Ultra-Lightweight TT
Lightweight TT
Junior TT
Senior TT

References

 
Sidecar racing